The Premios 40 Principales for Best America Album is an honor presented annually at the Los 40 Principales, in a ceremony that recognizes excellence and contributions of Latino artists in the international scene, and creates a greater awareness of cultural diversity.

This is a list of the Los Premios 40 Principales winners and nominees for Best America Album.

External links
Official site

Spanish awards
Spanish music
Latin American music
European music awards